Eight to the Bar is an American band founded in 1975 in New Haven, Connecticut. They have released twelve albums and toured both nationally and internationally.

Foundation
Eight to the Bar was founded by keyboardist, vocalist, and songwriter Cynthia Lyon and pedal steel guitar player John Brown in 1975 in New Haven, Connecticut as a Western-style swing band. The original lineup had eight members, male vocalist Rob Jockel, and Lyon singing lead and backup vocals with her sisters Todd and Barbara Lyon, bassist Tom McNamara, John Brown on pedal steel, drummer John Baker, and guitarist Matt Simpson. It eventually became a seven-piece band, and finally a six-piece band for most of its existence. The music in its early days has been described as “steel guitar-laced sound of old-school swing”, though within a few years they replaced the pedal steel guitar with a saxophone. Its sound evolved to be described as a blend of swing, boogie-woogie, blues, and Motown. They performed both covers and original material. 

After several lineup changes, the original band broke up ten years later when Lyon had tired of touring—however they were reassembled less than a year later.

Reformation
Eight to the Bar reconstituted its lineup upon reformation, with the only original member being Lyon. The lineup continued to change, and in 2005 three different previous lineups reunited in order to play the band’s thirtieth anniversary concert.

Touring

The band has toured throughout New England, with regular shows in each state, in addition to both the east and west cost of the US and international tour dates. Among the concerts, they have opened for groups and artists including Big Bad Voodoo Daddy, Manhattan Transfer, Robert Cray, Roy Orbison, and Ray Charles. They have also served as a local band on demand, performing at weddings in addition to their concert hall performances. In 2010 reporter Jay Miller wrote of their touring that "the band is nationally known and frequently tours overseas, but also stays busy with a variety of gigs from weddings to corporate parties to clubs to town concerts in the summer". Another reporter wrote that same year that, "Everyone in Connecticut knows ETTB, either because they played at their own wedding or their best friend's wedding or they saw them play a gig as far away as the Caribbean or as close as The Chowder Pot in Branford." By the 2010s, they were still performing up to 200 concert dates per year.

Recordings
The band’s first album was The Joint Is Jumpin, which they recorded in 1981 at Toad's Place in New Haven. This was followed by Swingin' School in 1984. After their hiatus, they released their third album, Redheads of Rhythm, in 1989. This was followed by their 1993 album Something Old, Something New, Something Rhythm, Something Blues, Beat Me Rocking in 1996, the album Hey Sailor! in 2001, Superhero Swinger Undercover in 2003, and You Call This Swing? in 2005. Their album Calling All Ickeroos was released in 2007, followed by their 2010 album The Romper Room.  

Upon the band’s fortieth anniversary in 2015 it released its twelfth album, entitled Bring It & Swing It!. At this stage the longest serving members other than Lyon had been involved since 1989—saxophonist Collin Tilton and bass player/vocalist Mike Corsini. Lyon’s husband, Collin Tilton, has also recorded and toured with Van Morrison and Etta James.

References

Musical groups from Connecticut
American swing musical groups
Musicians from New Haven, Connecticut